Ready When You Are, Mr. McGill is a feature length TV drama, written by Jack Rosenthal. ITV produced two versions, in 1976 and 2003. The 1976 version was the first in a series of six single television plays which aired in the anthology television series Red Letter Day; each of which showed the events in a single, special day in someone's life. The 2003 version was a remake which was partly rewritten by Rosenthal.

Plot 
The Ready When You Are, Mr McGill story is centred on the making of a film. A television actor-extra (Joe McGill) is finally given a line to say to camera. While filming, a collection of comical mishaps occur to create chaos on-set.

1976 version 
In the 1976 adaptation Joe Black takes the lead role of Joe McGill. It aired on ITV on 11 January 1976. The story revolves around a British soldier and his relationship with a suspicious school mistress, set in 1940. McGill's line is "I've never seen that young lady in my life before, and I've lived here fifty years". Jack Shepherd plays the stressed director, and Mark Wing-Davey is his assistant.

This version has been released on Region 2 DVD by Network, both as part of the compilation Jack Rosenthal at ITV, and as part of Red Letter Day box-set.

2003 version 

In the 2003 adaptation Tom Courtenay takes the lead role of Joe McGill. The story is centred on the making of a film starring Amanda Holden as a police officer and Bill Nighy as an increasingly frustrated director. McGill's line was, "I've never seen the young man in my life before, and I've worked here forty years."

Television industry
Rosenthal said his rewrite had turned the drama into a criticism of television executives, and argued that "the industry has gone crazy and it needs a new generation to change it into something better". He also criticised television schedulers. Although completed early in 2003 the resulting film was held back and had not been screened by the time Rosenthal died in May 2004; it turned out to be his last work. It was first screened, not on ITV but on Sky Movies 1, in September 2004.

Rosenthal's widow Maureen Lipman claimed that TV executives were reluctant to screen the film which was "maybe too acerbic". In April 2005 she challenged the management of ITV to show the film as a tribute to Rosenthal, threatening to kill them if it was put in a slot outside primetime. It was eventually shown on Boxing Day 2005 at 11:05pm.

See also
 Extra (acting)
 Bit part

External links

References 

1976 television films
1976 films
1976 comedy films
British comedy films
2000s English-language films
1970s English-language films
1970s British films
2000s British films